The Urluia is a right tributary of the Danube in Romania. It passes through Lake Vederoasa and flows into the Danube near Rasova. It flows along the villages Mereni, Miriștea, Osmancea, Ciobănița, Credința, Plopeni, Conacu, Negrești, Curcani, Petroșani, Șipotele, Zorile, Urluia, Aliman and Vlahii.

References

Rivers of Romania
Rivers of Constanța County